TDC Bình Dương Football Club is a Vietnamese football club which is based in Thủ Dầu Một, Vietnam. The club won Vietnam Second Division in 2009 and got promoted to 2010 Vietnamese First Division. TDC Bình Dương is under control of Bình Dương Trade & Development Joint-Stock Company. The club squad is mainly composed of young players from V.League 1 club Becamex Bình Dương.

Achievements

National competitions
Second League:
 Winners : 2008

Affiliated clubs
  Becamex Bình Dương

References

Association football clubs established in 2008
Football clubs in Vietnam
Association football clubs disestablished in 2013